Good Times is the debut studio album recorded by Finnish–German entrepreneur Kim Dotcom. It reached No. 8 in the Recorded Music NZ Top 40 album chart.

Background and recording
Good Times was recorded at Roundhead Studios in Auckland, New Zealand, and was begun in 2011. Dotcom said that he played the album to American hip hop producer Swizz Beatz, who enjoyed it.

Composition
Good Times is an electronic dance music (EDM) album, exploring a variety of subgenres, including trance and drum and bass, and features hip hop influences and synth sounds. It contains completely positive themes. Vicki Anderson of The Press compared Dotcom's vocals on the album to those of German electronic music band Kraftwerk.

Release and promotion
Good Times was released worldwide by his independent record label Kimpire Music on 20 January 2014. Dotcom performed at Rhythm & Vines on 31 December 2013; the set was filmed, and music videos for "Amazing", "Party Amplifier" and "Change Your Life" have been released.

Reception
Chris Schulz of The New Zealand Herald called the album "a musical mess" and rated it one star out of five. Gizmodo's Jack Tomlin criticised the album for being overproduced; he wrote that if it is meant by Dotcom to be a satirical take on contemporary EDM, then it is excellent. David Farrier from 3 News described the album as "not as bad as you'd expect".

Good Times entered the New Zealand Albums Chart dated 27 January 2014 at number twenty. The following week it moved up to number seventeen. The week after that, it reached number eight, its peak position.

Track listing

References

2014 debut albums
Kim Dotcom albums
Albums recorded at Roundhead Studios